Soulfarm (formerly known as Inasense) is an American Jewish rock band based in New York City. They were founded in 1991 by C Lanzbom and Noah Solomon.  Their music is a mix of mainstream rock, Jewish/Middle Eastern, bluegrass, and Celtic influences (among others). Soulfarm is a fixture on the New York City club circuit. The band has also traveled extensively throughout the world.

Band members
Current
 C Lanzbom – lead guitar, vocals
 Noah Solomon – lead vocals, guitar, mandolin
 Mitch Friedman – bass, vocals
 Ben Antelis – drums, vocals

Former
Mark Ambrosino – drums
Jay Weissman – bass
Gilad Dobrecky – percussion
T Lavitz – Hammond organ
Fred Walcott – percussion
Jerome Goldschmidt – percussion
Jeff Langsten – bass
Yoshie Fruchter – bass
Andrew Frawley – drums, percussion

Discography

Inasense (1996) (as Inasense)
The Ride (1997) (as Inasense)
Get Your Shinebox (2000) (as Inasense)
Scream of the Crop (2001)
Unwind (2003)
Monkey Dance (2008)
Holy Ground (2010)
Blue and White (2012)
The Bridge (2014)
Lost and Found (2015)

External links
 Soulfarm Home Page
 C Lanzbom's Home Page

References

Jewish musical groups
Jewish American musicians
Jewish folk rock groups
Musical groups from New York City